Vanja Rogulj (born February 13, 1982, in Split, SR Croatia, Yugoslavia) is a 3-time Olympics breaststroke swimmer from Croatia. He swam for Croatia at the 2000, 2004 and 2008 Olympics.

He won the 100 m breaststroke at the 2001 Mediterranean Games in Tunis, Tunisia. In 2000 he won the bronze medal in the 4 × 100 m medley relay at the Short Course European Championships.

He attend college at and swam for the USA's University of Virginia.

At the 2008 European Championships, he bettered the Croatian Records in the 100 m breaststroke to 1:01.82. As of June 2009, he also holds the Croatian Records in the 50 m and 200 m breaststrokes (28.08 and 2:16.85) in 2003 and 2004, respectively.

See also
 World Fit

External links

 Short profile on Croatian Olympic Committee

1982 births
Living people
Male breaststroke swimmers
Croatian male swimmers
Olympic swimmers of Croatia
Swimmers at the 2000 Summer Olympics
Swimmers at the 2004 Summer Olympics
Swimmers at the 2008 Summer Olympics
Sportspeople from Split, Croatia
European Aquatics Championships medalists in swimming
Mediterranean Games gold medalists for Croatia
Mediterranean Games silver medalists for Croatia
Swimmers at the 2001 Mediterranean Games
Mediterranean Games medalists in swimming